Mississippi Highway 613 (MS 613) is a  north-south state highway in the eastern Mississippi Gulf Coast region of southeastern Mississippi. It connects the town of Lucedale with the city of Pascagoula.

Route description

It heads northeast as a four-lane undivided highway along Telephone Road through a mix of neighborhoods and business districts, where it passes by the Jackson County Fairgrounds and Civic Center at a large intersection with Shortcut Road, where it curves northward to pass through another business district to enter the neighboring city of Moss Point at an intersection with Jefferson Avenue. MS 613 passes through more neighborhoods before traveling straight through downtown along Main Street, where it has an intersection with Mc Innis Avenue (unsigned MS 618),  before leaving downtown and crossing the Jack G. Hanson Memorial Bridge over the Escatawpa River. The highway has an interchange with I-10 (Exit 68) before leaving Moss Point, narrowing to two-lanes, and traveling north through the community of Escatawpa and having an intersection with MS 63 directly beside Plant Daniel. MS 613 heads northeast for a few miles to the community of Big Point, were it curves back northward as it passes through the communities of Hurley (where it has an intersection with MS 614) and Harleston before crossing into George County.

MS 613 winds its way northwest through rural farmland for several miles, passing through the communities of Agricola and Evanston, to enter the city limits of Lucedale and travel through some neighborhoods along Carter Street before turning north (right) onto Mill Street in a small business district. The highway passes through more neighborhoods for several blocks before entering downtown and coming to an end at an intersection with MS 198 (Main Street) near the center of town.

History
Historically, the alignment of MS 613 was the previous route for MS 63. MS 63 was realigned westward from Big Point, Hurley and Agricola by 1960, with MS 613 designated northward from their meeting outside Moss Point to US 98 in Lucedale. With a new alignment built for MS 63 south into Moss Point, MS 613 was extended south over the former MS 63 to Pascagoula by 1981.

Major intersections

References

External links

613
Transportation in Jackson County, Mississippi
Transportation in George County, Mississippi